Michael "MP" Peterson (24 September 1952 – 29 March 2012) was a professional Australian surfer. He was considered one of the best surfers in Australia during the early to mid-1970s and was recognised for his deep tube riding skill, especially at Kirra on the Gold Coast, Australia. Peterson was the Australian champion in the years 1972 and 1974, and won many other major surfing competitions. Peterson was eventually diagnosed with schizophrenia and became publicly known for using illicit drugs.

Youth 
Peterson was born in a working-class family and lived in several places; the family eventually settled in Coolangatta, when Peterson was 15 years of age, on Queensland, Australia's Gold Coast. Peterson lived in Coolangatta with his mother, Joan, younger brother, Tommy, and younger sisters, Dorothy (Dot) and Denice.

As a young boy, Peterson was involved in surf lifesaving and became a member of the Tweed Heads and Coolangatta Surf Life Saving Club; he won many junior titles for swimming. Being a surf lifesaver, also known as a "clubbie", was unpopular during Peterson's youth; but he received access to a locker and warm shower at the beach and therefore maintained his involvement over subsequent years. The price for Peterson's lifesaving perks was a half-day commitment on surf patrol every month, with a requirement that he wear "sluggos" and monitor the safety of swimmers. However, Peterson became impatient with the conditions of the role and would arrange for his brother to join him on patrol for company.

Peterson commenced surfing on "surf-o-planes" (an inflated rubber mat device invented in 1932) and then graduated to a board called a "Coolite" (constructed from a form of polystyrene beaded foam and first introduced at the beginning of the 1970s). During Peterson's upbringing, his family experienced difficulty with income security and his mother worked extremely long hours in a variety of jobs (such as peeling prawns) to support the children. The Peterson boys couldn't afford to own boards of any kind, and were only able to hire or borrow them; either from Billy Rak at Greenmount or Johnny Charlton at Kirra, both of whom ran tourist hire businesses. The two boys were eventually employed by Rak for two summers, setting up and transporting surfboards for tourists.

Peterson attained ownership of his first surfboard in 1966, when he retrieved broken and abandoned boards that had been washed up on the rocks at Greenmount Beach. As leg ropes had not yet been introduced, surfers would lose their boards relatively easily and frequently, leaving people like Peterson to collect what remained. The brothers would take the remnants home, make rough repairs and then return to the water to try out their rejuvenated boards. It was during this time that the Peterson boys discovered another advantage of surf club membership; weekend surfers from Brisbane would leave their boards at the club during the week, enabling the brothers to choose from a wide selection of items for their own unpermitted use.

In September 1967, around the time of Peterson's 15th birthday, the family moved to units in Tweed St, Coolangatta, and the boys set up a board shaping bay underneath. On the premise that surfboards would be less expensive to make than buy, the brothers sought out resin and fibreglass offcuts from local factories. For the creation of a "blank" (a foam core component that is re-modelled into a specific surfboard shape), Peterson would extract them from old longboards. Like the Petersons, many of the local kids could not afford to purchase new surfboards either and the home-based business consequently flourished through meeting this demand, eventually expanding to the garage of Peterson's friend, Peter Townend

Unknowingly, the cut-downs that the Peterson's were making placed them at the centre of the shortboard revolution. 8-foot boards would be cut down to 6 feet, 8 inches, or to 6-foot, or right down to 5 feet, 1 inch (although, they soon realised that they had gone too far with the smallest measurement when they were overwhelmed by the big waves at Kirra.  The shortest length that they ever constructed was 4 feet, 3 inches, for their friend, Kerry Gill, who actually found that the model suited him.

Peterson's first new board, a board that he perceived as "proper", was attained in 1968.  His mother offered to buy him a new surfboard if Peterson won the Greenmount Surf Lifesaving Club championship. With Peterson's consistent competitive drive spurred on by such an offer, he was a convincing winner; two weeks later, Peterson received a 7 feet, 11 inches board from local shaper, Ken Gudenswager.

Morning of the Earth 
In February 1971, Australian surf filmmaker, Alby Falzon, was filming for Morning of the Earth on the Gold Coast; the time period is known for some of the most significant swell ever seen at the history of the location (12 continuous weeks in which the waves rarely measured below "head height"). Previously, Falzon had published a picture of Peterson in the magazine, Tracks (co-founded and published by Falzon), accompanied by an article about the "underground" Gold Coast scene; on the day of the Tracks photograph, Falzon happened to be filming at Kirra, Queensland, while Peterson was exposing his talent on a surfboard.

The result of the February 1971 filming session was a three-minute sequence that was included in Morning of the Earth, while numerous were printed in Tracks. The photograph of Peterson that gained the most attention became known as "the cutback"—it featured Peterson, tall and muscular, with his long hair flying, executing a "cutback" manoeuvre at Kirra. The "cutback" picture became the cover for the July 1972 issue of Tracks, following the release of the film.

Peterson did not attend the local premiere of Morning of the Earth on 10 January 1972. Peterson's mother, Joan, transported him to the hall at Miami High (his old school) where the premier was occurring, but Peterson balked at being the "centre of attention" and both returned home. Peterson's nervousness at presentations and gatherings would be a repeat occurrence on numerous occasions in the future.

One of Peterson's secrets for surfing barrels at Kirra was the "rocker" (underside curvature) design used in his boards. Rather than lifting the nose near the end of the board, Peterson transferred the apex closer to the middle of the board and would ride with one foot either side of the apex. By shifting his weight onto the back foot, the rear of the board would be receive the primary emphasis and the board would stall as a result; this would allow Peterson to slow down to re-enter deeper into the tube. Then, shifting weight forward onto the nose of the surfboard would lead to the board shooting forward. Peterson revealed to Mike Perry, who shaped surfboards alongside him for a period of time, that "It's just like cheating, man."

Early contests 
In 1971, Peterson won the Kirra Pro-Am contest, the first Queensland contest to offer any prize money (A$150); following this, Peterson also won the Queensland Titles, the final round of which was at Kirra. The Queensland Titles victory earned Peterson a starting place in the Australian Titles that was held at Bells Beach, Victoria, Australia (incorporated into the Bells Beach Classic); however, Peterson competed poorly at Bells Beach, with his narrow board unsuited to the broader waves.

Meanwhile, in Coolangatta, the police had commenced an unofficial campaign to change the standards of the beaches according to orders that they had received; this involved getting rid of marijuana and the undesirable types who were not compatible with the family-oriented image that the local chamber of commerce sought to promote. Surfers were a primary target due to the societal perception of the sub-culture and, on occasion, individuals were framed by police officers. By this stage, Peterson had heavily smoked marijuana for a significant period of time and, on 24 January 1972, was arrested for "possession" and "supply"; Peterson was fortunate and received a A$500 fine instead of a three-month prison sentence.

Involvement with the legal system temporarily curbed Peterson's marijuana habit, but it was not long before he resumed smoking. Peterson found relaxation in marijuana use—one of the few things that could ameliorate what have later been identified as early symptoms of his schizophrenia. In subsequent years, Peterson was well known for smoking "joints" (rolled marijuana cigarettes) before or after surfing, and even before contests. Others might have found that the drug made it too difficult to concentrate properly, but Peterson did not seem to experience such a hindrance. In both his younger and older years, Peterson rarely consumed alcohol and was never seen drunk; he was more likely to be stoned and drinking lemonade while his peers were drinking.

Australian champion 
In 1972, Peterson successfully defended his Queensland Title, narrowly beating Townend (Townend became known for a high number of "second-place" finishes during his career.) The win enabled Peterson to compete in the Australian titles again; however, he almost didn't get there due to the under-handed actions of the "Windansea" surf club.

In 1972, Paul Neilsen was the reigning Australian surfing champion, but did not reach the Queensland titles final; therefore, he was unable to defend his Australian title. As a means to overcome such a hindrance, Neilson's club, Windansea, from Surfers Paradise, devised a scheme in which Peterson's drug conviction would be raised at the inter-club meeting to oust Peterson in favour of Neilsen. The meeting eventually descended into chaos and the selections were subject to a vote by the club members; Billy Grant was ultimately omitted from the competition.

The 1972 Australian titles were held at North Narrabeen in Sydney. Peterson managed to make it into the final round, but the surfing conditions worsened and the organisers cancelled the final. Peterson was declared the winner, with Townend attaining second place.

As a result of his win at North Narabeen, Peterson competed in the 1972 World Titles in San Diego, United States (US). Peterson made it through his first round heat but, due to an error by the judging panel in the second round, Peterson was eliminated.

1973 
The Bells Beach Classic in 1973 offered a A$1000 prize, an amount that was very substantial at that time; the event was also run under a new "points per manoeuvre" system, which had been trialled at the Hang Ten event in Hawaii, US, a few months earlier. The idea was to eliminate subjectivity from judging by only counting the moves that were completed by each contestant. In the first few rounds, under difficult surf conditions, Peterson performed poorly and his total points score left him outside the top ten positions. On the final day at Bells Beach, the leading surfer, Midget Farrelly, was forced to withdraw due to a flu. After transitioning to a larger surfboard, Peterson subsequently won the contest and was amazed when told of his victory.

The 1973 Australian titles were held at Margaret River, Western Australia, and the contestants were required to contend with big surf conditions. Although Peterson scored highly in the early rounds, fellow Queenslander, Richard Harvey, emerged victorious and Townend was runner-up.

Following his return to the Gold Coast, Peterson engaged in more board shaping work; however, he left Larkin's factory to join Furry Austen, after Austen offered higher remuneration.

1974 
1974 was a significant year for Peterson, as it was his most successful in terms of contest results.

The year started with a second-place finish to Wayne "Rabbit" Bartholomew in the Queensland titles. Intense rivals at the time, the loss was Peterson's second to Bartholomew in the Queensland titles event.

Peterson then won the Kirra Pro-Am, in a victory that was the start of a renowned run of wins. The next event was the Bells Beach Classic, where Peterson won by a big margin with a tightly controlled performance.

The inaugural 2SM/Coca-Cola Surfabout was held in May 1974. A A$2400 first prize was offered by the soft drink sponsor and a new prize record was set for the Australian contest circuit. Surfers from both Australia and the rest of the world competed, including Nat Young, who had otherwise become disillusioned with the contest circuit. Although Townend was in the lead for most of the competition, with a young Mark Richards in second, Peterson eventually won the event.

The Australian titles for 1974 were held at Snapper Rocks and Burleigh Heads, and again, Peterson was victorious.

In 1974, Townend gave Peterson the nickname "MP" as a response to Peterson calling Townend "PT". Townend used the nickname in newspaper columns and it eventually became widely used. Peterson was averse to the nickname in later years, associating it with superficiality; however, the ubiquitous use of the name still persists.

Peterson Surf Shop 
In September 1974 Peterson started his Michael Peterson Surfboards business, with a factory in Currumbin next to the Burford Blanks factory, and a shop in Musgrave St, Kirra, right opposite the Kirra beach.  His name by then was so big it seemed a sure winner.  A caption in the Brisbane Courier Mail wondered if he could be "Australia's first millionaire surfer".

He had a rather inflated idea of his own business acumen, but did have the sense not to try to go it alone, he brought in Paul Hallas as a partner.  Hallas was a fellow Kirra surfer and had worked alongside Peterson at Hohensee's factory.  They had a total of seven staff and would sell boards up and down the coast, often delivered by Peterson himself in his panel van.

Orders for boards soon flooded in, more than they could fill.  The boards they supplied were actually more designed for Peterson's level of skill than the average surfer, but the "MP" label certainly made them sell.  The problem was that Peterson wasn't very business minded and would too often sell stock out the back door or treat the business like a personal bank when it was going well.

Eventually Hallas despaired and by mutual agreement let himself be bought out by Peterson's mother Joan for just $1000.  If run well the business should have been a gold mine, but he thought getting out was the smartest thing to do, and he remained friends with Peterson.  Joan took charge, but couldn't much improve the overall operation.  She ended up walking away in 1977 when Peterson brought in a girlfriend who Joan strongly disapproved of, and shortly after that the business folded.

Moonrocket (surfboard) 
During 1974 and 1975, Peterson shaped a 6'6", six-channel triple-flyer pintail at his own factory, a surfboard that became known by several names: the 'Moonrocket', the 'Fangtail' or the 'Christmas Tree'. The fang-like flyers at the back of the board and the finger-deep channels also made it a glasser's nightmare, a role held at Peterson's factory by Peter Evans at the time.

The Moonrocket was Peterson's secret weapon for the Pa Bendall contest at the start of 1975, held at Caloundra on Queensland's Sunshine Coast, and Peterson's victory earned him an AUS$2000 prize, continuing his run of success from 1974.

The board was later passed to Peter Harris, a young male who worked at Peterson's factory, and was given in lieu of wages owed following the closure of the business. In 1995, Tommy Peterson made a replica of the board and it was presented as the prize for Kelly Slater's win in Australia's Surfing Life magazine's peer poll that year.

Illicit drug use
Peterson first tried heroin during 1974 and increased his involvement with the drug in 1975. It has been suggested that a vacuum (slightly similar to a "demand vacuum") had been created in the local drug market as a result of the Queensland Police's attempts to eradicate the Gold Coast's marijuana trade in the operations of previous years. Consequently, a significant number of surfers in the area took heroin and then fatally overdosed on the drug, with professional surfer, Wayne "Rabbit" Bartholomew, having written about the loss of twelve friends in such a manner.

Peterson was phobic regarding hypodermic needles and his preferred mode of administration for heroin was insufflation (commonly known as "snorting"). Tommy Peterson, who also experienced dependence upon the drug over numerous years, has stated a belief that his brother's fear of injections led to a greatly reduced overdose risk, due to the limited amount of heroin that can be used when employing the insufflation method.

During Peterson's heroin-using period, his schizophrenia gradually worsened and his friends reported increasingly erratic behaviour, hostility towards others (including friends) and paranoid delusions in which he believed that others were plotting against him. In retrospect, the symptoms exhibited by Peterson have been identified as typical of the surfer's mental disorder; at the time, though, friends and acquaintances attributed the unusual behaviour to excessive drug use. Friends have since expressed regret at the low level of support they offered Peterson at the time.

Late career 
At the start of 1976, Peterson went to New Zealand for the first event in the new IPS professional world tour; although, many of his well-known fellow surfers chose to participate in Hawaii's more prestigious Duke contest.  Peterson won the event, but Townend was the eventual winner of the series that year.

In 1977, the inaugural Stubbies contest, organised by Peter Drouyn, was held at Burleigh Heads.  Drouyn had devised a "man on man" heats system for the contest, a system that is used in ASP World Tour contests today. Peterson comfortably reached the semi-final round, in which he competed against Bartholomew. Scoring was based on the entire heat and the judges were split in their final decision; however, Peterson attained the winning score; the decision was a contentious topic for many years afterwards. The final placed Peterson in competition against a young Mark Richards and Peterson eventually won the AUS$5,000 prize after a close match.

The Stubbies event was Peterson's last major contest victory. Peterson subsequently lived a reclusive lifestyle, alternating between periods of illicit drug use and abstinence. Peterson reportedly camped at the base of Mount Warning, along with health food, to achieve a period of abstinence and detoxification. His solicitor later stated in a court case that Peterson had tried to detoxify on approximately 30 occasions. Peterson did surf intermittently during those years and also commenced windsurfing as an alternative recreational pursuit.

The chase 
On the evening of 9 August 1983, Peterson was travelling to Noosa to windsurf the next day. He pulled up at Beenleigh, south of Brisbane, to sleep but was startled by a police car with its siren blaring; the occurrence set Peterson into a panic and he speedily drove away. He had not realised the police car was actually going in the opposite direction and the police officer consequently pursued Peterson, with 20 police cars eventually joining the chase. Peterson mounted the footpath at one point, as the high-speed chase proceeded the vast distance to Brisbane, where a further 15 police cars formed a roadblock on the Story Bridge; the roadblock caused Peterson to stop. The pursuit later appeared on the national Australian news and became known in surfing circles as "the chase".

Following the incident, Peterson was held overnight in a cell at Beenleigh, prior to being taken to Boggo Road Gaol. The police presumed that he was drug-affected and confiscated his car, The Falcon, for the purpose of a search. Vitamin C tablets, part of Peterson's intermittent healthy eating regimes, were the only item that was uncovered. The car was eventually sent to the wreckers and Peterson received a year-long prison sentence, in addition to being banned from driving for life. The presiding judge also ordered a psychiatric report but a diagnosis was not revealed. Peterson began his sentence at Boggo Road and was present during some of the institution's infamous riots.

Peterson's mother lobbied her local state MP, the justice minister and the minister in charge of prisons to obtain medical assistance for her son; as a result, Peterson was eventually moved to Wacol Prison Hospital on 25 December 1983 for psychiatric treatment. His schizophrenia was diagnosed many years after onset and he received Mellaril medication. Peterson also consented to electroshock treatments and received two sessions.

Following his release from prison, Peterson returned to the Gold Coast and resided between care facilities and his mother's house. The prescribed medication helped considerably, but Peterson lived mostly as a recluse, rarely seeking out the company of former friends. A poor diet, combined with the psychiatric medication (especially Clozaril), caused Peterson's weight to increase to a point where he was scarcely recognisable.

Like many schizophrenics, Peterson heard voices and he reported the voices as being "friendly".

Later life 
Throughout 2002 and 2003, Peterson co-operated with surf writer and Tracks editor, Sean Doherty, on a biography of his life, establishing veracity to the conjecture that had thus far defined the public's knowledge of the surfer's life. Peterson had been healthy enough in the years previous to attend several surf functions, including a contest organised by the Kirra Surfriders club in 2002, called the "MP Classic", held in his honour.  The "MP Classic" raised approximately AUS$10,000 with the proceeds distributed to various local mental health services, including those that had supported Peterson.

Peterson had not surfed since the mid-1980s, but revealed to Doherty: "I haven't given it away!  Who told you that?  Is that what's getting around?". Peterson's friends strongly supported Peterson's return to surfing and, according to Bartholomew, many of his peers had not stopped surfing at that point in time.

Death
On 29 March 2012, Peterson died of a heart attack whilst inside his Australian home at Tweed Heads South, New South Wales; he was 59 years of age. Peterson was honored with a memorial service at Kirra. Mick Fanning, Rabbit Bartholomew and Kelly Slater were in attendance. Doug 'Claw' Warbrick spoke at the send off.

References

Sources
 Sean Doherty, MP: The Life of Michael Peterson, Harper Collins, 2004, .

External links 
 Michael Petersen pictures at surfresearch.com.au
 

1952 births
2012 deaths
Australian surfers
People with schizophrenia
People from Tweed Heads, New South Wales
Sportspeople from the Gold Coast, Queensland